Coelonia brevis is a moth of the family Sphingidae. It is known from Madagascar. It is a pollinator of some species of baobab in Madagascar, including Adansonia za.

The length of the forewings is about 39 mm for males.

References

Acherontiini
Moths described in 1915
Moths of Madagascar
Moths of Africa
Taxa named by Walter Rothschild
Taxa named by Karl Jordan